Reg Drew (21 August 1910 – 12 November 1992) was an  Australian rules footballer who played with St Kilda in the Victorian Football League (VFL).

Notes

External links 

1910 births
1992 deaths
Australian rules footballers from Victoria (Australia)
St Kilda Football Club players
Maryborough Football Club players